Wilhelm Theodor Söderberg (1845–1922) was a Swedish composer and music teacher.

Theodor Söderberg was the son of organist Wilhelm Oscar Söderberg. He studied at Stockholms musikkonservatorium, qualified as organist in 1867, and as conductor in 1870. He was married to Sigrid Elvira (née Strömberg), and became the father-in-law of the industrialist Fredrik Ljungström.

Wilhelm Theodor Söderberg served as music teacher in Stockholm 1871–1873 and as organist in Karlshamn from 1873. He was the piano teacher of Alice Tegnér.

Söderberg co-founded Karlshamns musiksällskap in 1876 and was its first dirigent 1876–1911.

Hymns
Ack, varför nu sörja?
En morgon utan synd jag vakna får, Nr 494 i Hemlandssånger 1892
Fröjdas vart sinne
Fort skynden alla
Gud är trofast, o min själ
Jag har i himlen en vän så god
Jag kom till korset och såg en man
Lev för Jesus, intet annat
Låt mig börja med dig
Modersvingen
På Sions berg

References

Further reading 
 Wilhelm Theodor Söderberg: en förgrundsfigur i Karlshamns musikliv för 100 år sedan (Bengt Ljungström, 1999, Karlshamn: Föreningen Karlshamns museum, ISSN 0283-7862)

1845 births
1922 deaths
Sacred music composers
Swedish classical composers
Classical pianists
Royal College of Music, Stockholm alumni
19th-century hymnwriters
20th-century hymnwriters
19th-century pianists
20th-century classical pianists